The Canton of Duclair is a former canton situated in the Seine-Maritime département and in the Haute-Normandie region of northern France. It was disbanded following the French canton reorganisation which came into effect in March 2015. It consisted of 17 communes, which joined the canton of Barentin in 2015. It had a total of 25,132 inhabitants (2012).

Geography 
An area of farmland, forestry, quarrying and light industry in the arrondissement of Rouen, centred on the town of Duclair. The altitude varies from 0m (Jumièges) to 134m (Saint-Martin-de-Boscherville) with an average altitude of 57m.

The canton comprised 17 communes:

Anneville-Ambourville
Bardouville
Berville-sur-Seine
Duclair
Épinay-sur-Duclair
Hénouville
Jumièges
Mauny
Le Mesnil-sous-Jumièges
Quevillon
Sainte-Marguerite-sur-Duclair
Saint-Martin-de-Boscherville
Saint-Paër
Saint-Pierre-de-Varengeville
Le Trait
Yainville
Yville-sur-Seine

Population

See also 
 Arrondissements of the Seine-Maritime department
 Cantons of the Seine-Maritime department
 Communes of the Seine-Maritime department

References

Duclair
2015 disestablishments in France
States and territories disestablished in 2015